Horry County Police Department is a full-service law enforcement agency in Horry County, South Carolina. Originally established by legislative decree the department became the primary county law enforcement agency in 1959. Re-endorsed by the citizens of the county in 1998 referendum Horry County Police Department is the only remaining county police department in the state of South Carolina.

Patrol area
Horry County Police are responsible for all non-traffic incidents that occur within the county and outside cities with their own Police Department. The municipalities of Aynor, Briarcliffe Acres, Conway Loris, Myrtle Beach, North Myrtle Beach and Surfside all have their own police force. The county is broken into 4 precincts and 22 sectors; each precinct has its own station.

Central Precinct
The Central precinct is made up of 4 patrol sectors (14-17). The Central precinct office is located in the M.L. Brown Public Safety Building in Conway.

South Precinct
The South precinct is made up of 6 patrol sectors (1-6). The precinct office is located in the South Strand Complex on Scipio Lane in Burgess. The precinct is made up of 6 sectors 1-6. The South Precinct also includes the Airport Division and Beach Patrol.

Myrtle Beach Intl. Airport Division
The Airport Division is responsible for 24 hour a day basic law enforcement functions and airport security. Led by one supervising Sergeant the 12 officers of the Airport Division patrol the airport ground by foot and vehicle. These officers are tasked with enforcing security requirements mandated by the Department of Homeland Security, and assisting TSA ensuring rules and regulations are followed.

Beach Patrol
Beach Patrol is responsible for the beachfront areas of the unincorporated areas of Horry County, such as Garden City Beach, Springmaid Beach, and the Lake Arrowhead area of Myrtle Beach. The team of 10 uniform officers use 4-wheel ATVs, jet skis and jet drive boats to patrol the coast and perform rescues. Unlike other uniform officers Beach Patrol receive specialized training in ocean life guard, personal watercraft operations and participate in open water training.

North Precinct
The North precinct is made up of 6 sectors (7-11). The precinct office is located behind the Ralph Ellis Building in Little River at Stephens Crossroads.

West Precinct
The West precinct is made up of 4 sectors (18-22). The precinct office is located off Mt. Olive Church Rd near Green Sea

Fallen officers
Dennis Lyden was shot by a driver Lyden attempted to stop. The suspect was arrested two days later and convicted and sentenced to death in June 2001.
Corporal Michael Ambrosino died after contracting COVID-19 while on duty.

References

External links 
Horry County Police Webpage

Horry County, South Carolina
County law enforcement agencies of South Carolina